Howard William Morgan (29 June 1931 – 16 March 2019) was a Welsh cricketer.  Morgan was a right-handed batsman who bowled right-arm off break.  He was born at Maesteg, Glamorgan.

Morgan played 2 first-class matches Glamorgan in 1958 against Leicestershire and Warwickshire.  In his 2 first-class matches, he took 2 wickets at a bowling average of 29.00, with best figures of 1/27.  With the bat he scored 11 runs batting average of 5.50, with a high score of 5.

After leaving Glamorgan at the end of the 1958 season, he became a schoolmaster in Cardiff, as well as a selector for the Welsh Schools Under-19 team.

References

External links
Howard Morgan at Cricinfo
Howard Morgan at CricketArchive

1931 births
2019 deaths
Sportspeople from Maesteg
English cricketers
Glamorgan cricketers
Welsh educators